The 2017 European Open was a men's tennis tournament played on indoor hard courts. It was the second edition of the European Open and part of the ATP World Tour 250 series of the 2017 ATP World Tour. It was taking place at the Lotto Arena in Antwerp, Belgium, from October 16 to October 22.

Singles main-draw entrants

Seeds

1 Rankings are as of October 9, 2017

Other entrants
The following players received wildcards into the singles main draw:
  Nick Kyrgios
  Frances Tiafoe
  Jo-Wilfried Tsonga

The following players received entry from the qualifying draw:
  Kenny de Schepper
  Aldin Šetkić
  Stefano Travaglia
  Stefanos Tsitsipas

Withdrawals
Before the tournament
  Aljaž Bedene →replaced by  Peter Gojowczyk
  Kyle Edmund →replaced by  Ruben Bemelmans
  Richard Gasquet →replaced by  Cedrik-Marcel Stebe
  Gaël Monfils →replaced by  Julien Benneteau
  Donald Young →replaced by  Sergiy Stakhovsky

Retirements
  Nikoloz Basilashvili
  Ivo Karlović
  Cedrik-Marcel Stebe

Doubles main-draw entrants

Seeds

1 Rankings are as of October 9, 2017

Other entrants
The following pairs received wildcards into the doubles main draw:
  Steve Darcis /  Arthur De Greef
  Sander Gillé /  Joran Vliegen

Finals

Singles 

  Jo-Wilfried Tsonga defeated  Diego Schwartzman, 6–3, 7–5

Doubles 

  Scott Lipsky /  Divij Sharan defeated  Santiago González /  Julio Peralta, 6–4, 2–6, [10–5]

External links 
 

2017
2017 ATP World Tour
2017 in Belgian tennis
October 2017 sports events in Europe